The 1963 Arizona State–Flagstaff Lumberjacks football team was an American football team that represented Arizona State College at Flagstaff (now known as Northern Arizona University) as an independent during the 1963 NCAA College Division football season. In their eighth year under head coach Max Spilsbury, the Lumberjacks compiled a 5–3–1 record and outscored opponents by a total of 194 to 128.

The team played its home games at Lumberjack Stadium in Flagstaff, Arizona.

Schedule

References

Arizona State-Flagstaff
Northern Arizona Lumberjacks football seasons
Arizona State-Flagstaff Lumberjacks football